WFTM (1240 AM) is a radio station  broadcasting a sports format. Licensed to Maysville, Kentucky, United States.  The station is currently owned by Standard Tobacco Co.

WFTM is an affiliate CBS Sports Radio. Previously WFTM was an affiliate of Westwood One's Kool Gold satellite-delivered format featuring mainly hits of the 1960s and 1970s.  Before that, the station aired an adult standards format.

References

External links

FTM